Nicolás Linares (born 6 December 1945) is a Bolivian footballer. He played in three matches for the Bolivia national football team from 1973 to 1975. He was also part of Bolivia's squad for the 1975 Copa América tournament.

References

1945 births
Living people
Bolivian footballers
Bolivia international footballers
Place of birth missing (living people)
Association football midfielders